The discography of Gerald Walker, an American hip hop rapper, and performer, consists of three studio albums and four mixtapes. Gerald Walker made his official debut with the acclaimed, Evening Out With Your Girlfriend, which was released in September 2009 through One Step at a Time Music.

Discography

Singles
2006: The Future (Produced by Slot-A)
2006: Stop Arguing (Produced by Kev Brown)
2007: Shout It Out featuring Symbolyc One
2010: Silent (Gerald Walker song)

Albums and mixtapes
2006: The Gerald Walker Sampler Disc
2007: The Stop Arguing EP
2008: Until The Last Moment EP
2009: Gerald Walker's Evening Out With Your Girlfriend... (Mixtape)
2010: I Remember When This All Meant Something... (Mixtape)
2010: A Gerald Walker Christmas EP
2011: On Your Side (With Taylor Gang producer, Cardo)
2011: The Other Half of Letting Go 
2011: It's Christmastime Again, Gerald Walker
2012: Believers Never Die

Guest appearances
2009: "Ho*s Got Feelings" Add-2 featuring Gerald Walker & Slot-A
2010: "Brand New" Woody featuring Gerald Walker & Nero
2016: "4AM" B-Nasty featuring Gerald Walker

Appearances 
 2008: Practice Makes Perfect (Remix) (Cute Is What We Aim For feat. Gerald Walker)
 2008: Let The Flames Begin (Remix) (Paramore feat. Gerald Walker)
 2008: To Bob Ross With Love (Remix) (Gym Class Heroes feat. Gerald Walker)
 2008: To Bob Ross With Love (Remix) (Gym Class Heroes feat. Gerald Walker)
 2009: Nothing But A Hero (Remix) (Tabbi Bonney feat. Gerald Walker)
 2009: Roxanne (Remix) (The Knux feat. Gerald Walker)
 2009: Everywhere (Remix) (Common feat. Martina Topley-Bird & Gerald Walker)
 2009: Fuck You (Remix) (Lily Allen feat. Gerald Walker)
 2009: Ring-A-Ling (Remix) (The Black Eyed Peas feat. Gerald Walker)
 2011: All Around The World Talent Couture feat. Gerald Walker)
 2011: The Struggle Streetz 'N' Young Deuces feat. Gerald Walker)

Magazines & Features 
 URB (March 2008)
 Stuck Magazine (2007)
 Feed Me Cool Shit Magazine (2006)

References

Discography
Hip hop discographies
Discographies of American artists